St. Joseph's College For Women is an autonomous college in Gnanapuram, Andra Pradesh. Established in 1958 by the Sisters of St. Joseph of Annecy, a Catholic religious institute, it was first women's college in Visakhapatnam, and indeed all of North Coastal Andhra Pradesh . It maintains a campus of about 7.5 acres and an enrolment of about 2500 students.

Institution
The college is a grant-in-aid institution, with NAAC A grade Science and Commerce courses, and Intermediate, Graduation and Post-graduation programs offered.

References

External links
 

Universities and colleges in Visakhapatnam
Colleges in Andhra Pradesh
Colleges affiliated to Andhra University
Catholic universities and colleges in India
Educational institutions established in 1958
Women's universities and colleges in Andhra Pradesh
1958 establishments in Andhra Pradesh